Up Jumped the Devil is a 1941 film.

Up Jumped the Devil may also refer to:
 Up Jumped the Devil (album), a 1977 album by John Davis and the Monster Orchestra
 "Up Jumped the Devil", a track on the Nick Cave and the Bad Seeds album Tender Prey